Jean Vatout (26 May 1791 – 3 November 1848) was a French poet and historian.

Vatout was born in Villefranche-sur-Saône.  He was the tenth member elected to occupy seat 4 of the Académie française in January 1848.  He died, aged 57, at Claremont, England.

References

External links
 

1791 births
1848 deaths
People from Villefranche-sur-Saône
19th-century French historians
Members of the Académie Française
French male poets
19th-century French poets
19th-century French male writers
French male non-fiction writers